Netflix is an American on-demand internet streaming media provider. Netflix and its programming have been nominated for multiple Television Critics Association Awards, listed below.

Programs

Program of the Year

Outstanding New Program

Achievement in Drama

Achievement in Comedy

Achievement in Movies, Miniseries, and Specials

Achievement in Reality Programming

Achievement in News and Information

Achievement in Sketch/Variety Shows

Achievement in Youth Programming

Individual Achievement

Achievement in Drama

Achievement in Comedy

See also
Main
 List of accolades received by Netflix

Others
 List of BAFTA Awards received by Netflix
 List of Golden Globe Awards received by Netflix
 List of Critics' Choice Awards received by Netflix
 List of Daytime Emmy Awards received by Netflix
 List of Primetime Emmy Awards received by Netflix
 List of Screen Actors Guild Awards received by Netflix
 List of Primetime Creative Arts Emmy Awards received by Netflix

References

Lists of accolades received by Netflix
TCA Awards ceremonies